Crowlands railway station was the first station on the closed Navarre railway line. 
Crowlands  is a township located approximately 24 kilometres (15 mi) northeast of the town of Ararat.

References 

Disused railway stations in Victoria (Australia)